The Ligue de Martinique d'Athlétisme (LMA) is the governing body for the sport of athletics in Martinique. The current president is Max Morinière. He was elected for the first time in November 2010, and re-elected in October 2012.

As LMA is part of the Fédération française d'athlétisme, athletes from Martinique normally participate internationally for France, for example, in the European Athletics Championships as organized by the EAA. On the other hand, Martinique as a French overseas department is part of the Caribbean.  As an observer member of CACAC, Martinique is invited to participate at the championships, and also at the CARIFTA Games.

History 
LMA was founded on November 29, 2008, replacing the Ligue Régionale d'Athlétisme de Martinique.

Affiliations 
Fédération française d'athlétisme (FAA)
LMA is an observer member federation for Martinique in the
Central American and Caribbean Athletic Confederation (CACAC)
LMA is invited to participate at the
CARIFTA Games

Regional records 
LMA maintains the Martinique records in athletics.

External links 
Official webpage (in French)
LMA on Facebook  (in French)

References 

Martinique
Sports governing bodies in France
Sport in Martinique
2008 establishments in France
National governing bodies for athletics
Sports organizations established in 2008